The Alfred National Park is a national park located in the East Gippsland region of the Australian state of Victoria.

It is currently closed due to widespread bushfire damage.

Features

The park reserves examples of warm temperate rainforest, particularly the jungle of Mount Drummer. Compared to the tropical rainforests of Queensland and New South Wales, this is a floristically depauperate forest, representing as it does the southern limit of this flora. This region is biogeographically interesting as the meeting point between the subtropical flora of the north of Australia and the cool temperate and arid zone floras of the south and west. The rainforest community consists of a closed canopy of Lilly Pilly Acmena smithii with numerous lianas, ferns, and epiphytes. The park is particularly known for the occurrence of four varieties of tree ferns and epiphytic orchids such as the orange-blossom orchid Sarcochilus falcatus and the rock orchid Dendrobium speciosum. In the 1983 'Ash Wednesday' bushfires, the park was burned very badly.

See also

 Protected areas of Victoria

References

External links

National parks of Victoria (Australia)
Protected areas established in 1925
1925 establishments in Australia
East Gippsland